Samantha Britton (born 8 December 1973) is an English retired footballer, and former England international player. An extremely versatile performer, Britton was equally at home playing in defence, midfield or attack.

Britton played for England in the 1995 FIFA Women's World Cup.

She dropped out of the side after the finals, but scored on her return two years later as England beat Scotland 4–0. At the time she was playing for Cove Rangers in Scotland, but was looking for a move back to the English Premier League. She had previously played for Arsenal.

Britton got her wish as she joined Croydon for 1997–98, featuring in the 3-2 FA Women's Cup final defeat to Arsenal. She moved to Doncaster Belles the following season. In summer 2000 Britton played for IBV in Iceland, finishing as the club's top goalscorer with 12 goals in 14 games.

During qualifying for Euro 2001, Britton pre-empted the results of a random drugs test by admitting to smoking marijuana. She was subsequently banned for seven months by England coach Hope Powell and missed six Everton matches while attending a voluntary rehabilitation programme. Britton was recalled to the England squad for the European Championship finals.

In March 2005 she was playing for Everton, having re-joined from Leeds United in January 2003.

Personal life
Britton is of Jamaican descent through her father.

References

1973 births
Living people
English women's footballers
England women's international footballers
English sportspeople of Jamaican descent
Arsenal W.F.C. players
Everton F.C. (women) players
Leeds United Women F.C. players
Doncaster Rovers Belles L.F.C. players
Charlton Athletic W.F.C. players
FA Women's National League players
1995 FIFA Women's World Cup players
English expatriate women's footballers
Expatriate women's footballers in Iceland
British expatriates in Iceland
Women's association football utility players
Bronte L.F.C. players
Women's association football defenders
Women's association football midfielders
Women's association football forwards
Footballers from Huddersfield
Huddersfield Town W.F.C. players